Jayakumari Devika is a Malayali historian, feminist, social critic and academician from Kerala. She currently researches and teaches at the Centre for Development Studies, Thiruvananthapuram as a Professor. She has authored several books and articles on gender relations in early Kerala society. She is bilingual and has translated both fiction and non-fiction books between Malayalam and English. She also writes on gender, politics, social reforms and development in Kerala on publications like Kafila, Economic and Political Weekly and The Wire.

Education 

Devika did her Master of Arts in Modern History (1991) from Centre for Historical Studies, Jawaharlal Nehru University, New Delhi and obtained her Ph.D. in History from Mahatma Gandhi University, Kottayam.

Writings
Devika's early research was about the emergence of modern binary gender as a language of describing society and social change in the early twentieth century in Kerala. In her later writings, she has followed the gendering of development in Kerala through a history of public consent for contraception between the 1930s and 1970. She has also published translations of writings by first-generation feminists in Kerala in the book Her Self: Early Writings on Gender by Malayalee Women 1898-1938. In her later research, Devika explores contemporary political and social issues through a historical lens and her concerns are wider than gender, and rather, focus on intersectional power. Her later books have been about gender and politics in twentieth century Kerala, and about the gendered history of the Malayali literary public.

She has published an introduction to feminist theory that places it within the history of modern western thought, titled Streevadam, and published in 2000. In her book Kulasthreeyum Chanthappennum Undaayathengine? she gives an alternative reading of Kerala history from the feminist perspective. She traces Kerala's social and political history and providing interesting insights. For example, she explains how dress code of saree and dowry became prevalent in Kerala. The Hindu reports in their review
"Authored by J. Devika, Associate Professor at the CDS, the book is an incisive take on the invisible spaces to which women have been consigned in conventional history and reaches out to the silent depths where women's powerful actions and articulations of the past lay buried. The book, an attempt to centre-stage women in Kerala history, looks how false notions about women got reinforced in the public mind because of the accounts in the "neutral" history texts, how freedom has eluded Kerala women despite their high educational entitlements and what role they have played in major historical junctures.". Her work in this area also includes the 2007 book Engendering Individuals: The Language of Re-Forming in Early Twentieth Century Keralam, and the 2008 book Individuals, Householders, Citizens: Malayalis and Family Planning, 1930–1970.

Devika has translated number of books from Malayalam to English. Notable among them are the translation of Nalini Jameela's autobiography and the short stories of K. R. Meera and Sarah Joseph. She also translated the well acclaimed Malayalam novel, Arrachar by K. R. Meera into English as Hangwoman in 2014. In 2017, She translated the Malayalam novel, Enmakaje by Ambikasuthan Mangad into English as Swarga.

She has published several essays in academic journals published from within and outside India, delivered several talks around the world and written extensively on contemporary issues in Malayalam and English. Devika also writes extensively in Malayalam, in contemporary publications.She has also written for children, and her work was published by the Kerala Shastra Sahitya Parishat

She also has a website about the first generation Malayalee feminists called Swantryavaadini.

Publications

Books in English 
(Jointly with Binitha V Thampi) New Lamps for Old? Gender Paradoxes of Political Decentralization in Kerala, Zubaan, New Delhi, 2012.
Individuals, Householders, Citizens: Malayalees and Family Planning, 1930s-1970′, Zubaan, New Delhi, 2008.
En-Gendering Individuals: The Language of Re-forming in Early 20th Century Keralam, Orient Longman, Hyderabad, 2007.

Books in malayalam 
 Navasiddhantangal: Streevadam(New Theory Series: Feminism), D.C Books: Kottayam, Kerala, 2000.
NirantharaPrathipaksham: J DevikaudeLekhanangal 2004-2018 (Selected Essays in Malayalam), Kottayam: DC Books, forthcoming, 2021.
PauriyuteNottangal (Woman-Citizen’s Eye-view), Olive Books: Kozhikode, 2013.
 (Ed.), AanarashunaatileKazhchakal: KeralamStreepakshaGaveshanattil (Sights from Male-dom: Kerala under Feminist Lenses), Women’s Imprint, Thiruvananthapuram, 2006.
PennorumbettaalLokanMaarunnu: LinganeethiyudeViplavangal, (The World Changed When Women Move: Gender-Revolutions), Thiruvananthapuram, Readme Books, 2017.

Journals

Translations

From Malayalam to English 
The Cock is the Culprit, by Unni R, Amazon-Westland, 2020.
One Hell of a Lover and Other Stories by UnniR,Amazon-Westland, 2019.
The Deepest Blue [English translation of KR Meera’sKarineela], in Mini Krishnan (ed.), The Oxford Book of Long Short Stories, New Delhi: OUP, 2017.
‘He-ghoul’, [translation of K R Meera’s ‘Aanpretham’] for Shinie Antony (ed), Boo: 13 Stories that Will Send a Chill Down Your Spine, Penguin Random House, 2017.
“Sweet offering at Chankranthy”, by TKC Vadutala, in M Dasanet. al (eds) The Oxford Anthology of Malayalam Dalit Writing, New Delhi: OUP, 2012.
Swarga, English translation of Ambikasuthan Mangad's Enmakaje: Published by Juggernaut Books

From English to Malayalam 
Samakaalika India: OruSamoohasastraavalokanam, KSSP: Thrissur, 2014. (Translation of SatishDeshpande’s Contemporary India: A Sociological View)
AkamePottiyaKettukalkkappuram: Indian FeminisathinteVarthamaanam(Malayalam version of NiveditaMenon’sSeeing like a Feminist, Penguin, N Delhi), SahityaPravarthakaSahakaranaSangham, 2017.

References

External links
 

Jawaharlal Nehru University alumni
Indian women historians
20th-century Indian historians
Living people
Scientists from Thiruvananthapuram
20th-century Indian women writers
20th-century Indian writers
20th-century Indian women scientists
20th-century Indian scientists
Writers from Thiruvananthapuram
Indian feminist writers
Malayali people
Women writers from Kerala
Women educators from Kerala
Educators from Kerala
1968 births